The Dutch cruiser HNLMS Sumatra was a small protected cruiser with a heavy main gun.  The ship was named after the island of Sumatra in the Dutch East Indies (now Indonesia). It was discarded in 1907.

Design and construction
The design resembled a smaller version of the Esmeralda concept (the 1883 protected cruiser built by Armstrong/Elswick shipyards for Chile) and is most similar in size to the Chinese protected cruiser Chi Yuan (1883) a ship built at about the same time as Esmeralda.  
Sumatra had the 8.2-inch gun forward and the 5.9-inch gun aft, both in shields, with sponsons on the sides for the two 4.7-inch guns.  The Dutch Navy also built a larger protected cruiser with even heavier armament,  launched in 1892, which had an 11-inch gun forward and was most comparable to the Japanese protected cruisers of the  type. These ships represented a design philosophy in which navies that could not afford first-class battleships (including the Netherlands) mounted heavy weapons on coastal defense ships or moderately sized protected cruisers with the idea these ships would pose a threat to first-class opponents.

References

Bibliography

19th-century naval ships of the Netherlands
1890 ships